Tha Pho Si is a tambon (subdistrict) located in the central region of Det Udom District, in Ubon Ratchathani Province, Thailand. In 2021, it had a population of 7,056 people. Neighbouring subdistricts are (clockwise from the south) Top Hu, 	Non Sombun, Na Charoen, Mueang Det, and Klang.

History
The area was first settled in the late 1800s, with the first village, Bak Waeng (บักแหว่ง), governed by Mueang Det, the district capital. The settlement was eventually renamed "Tha Pho Si" in 1902, after the giant sandbox tree (Pho Si) that was founded near the waterfront pavilion on the bank of the Lam Dom Yai River.

The Tha Pho Si subdistrict was formed in 1976 by combining two areas splitting from Mueang Det and Klang, which consisted of five and one villages, respectively.

Geography
The tambon is located in the central region of the Det Udom district, on the low river plain of the Lam Dom Yai River.

Administration
The Tha Pho Si subdistrict is divided into eight administrative villages (mubans; หมู่บ้าน), one of which, Tha Pho Si village, was further divided into four community groups (Mu; หมู่). The entire area is governed by the Subdistrict Administrative Organization of Tha Pho Si (องค์การบริหารส่วนตำบลท่าโพธิ์ศรี; Tha Pho Si SAO).

As of the 2021 census, it had a population of 7,056 people with 2,550 households. The following is a list of the subdistrict's mubans, which roughly correspond to the villages.

References

Tambon of Ubon Ratchathani Province